Norwegian School of Creative Studies aims to educate people for a number of professions within the creative industries.

The school was founded in 1987, and is part of the educational foundation Campus Kristiania.

The school has approx. 1 800 students, and campuses in six cities; Oslo, Bergen, Trondheim and Stavanger.

Norwegian School of Creative Studies offer the following 2-year vocational programmes:

 Film
 Photography
 Graphic design
 Illustration
 Interior design
 Journalism
 Macdesign (1-year)
 Motion design and 3D-animation
 Music design
 Advertising and brand communication
 Interaction design

Norwegian School of Creative Studies has partnerships with a range of universities in Europe, Oceania and United States.

External links
 Norwegian School of Creative Studies Official Website

Schools in Norway
Educational institutions established in 1987
1987 establishments in Norway